Cynthia Lynn (born Zinta Valda Ziemelis; April 2, 1937 – March 10, 2014) was a Latvian-American actress.

Early life
Lynn was born in Riga, Latvia, as Zinta Valda Ziemelis. At age eight, she and her mother, Alisa, fled the country prior to the Soviet re-occupation of Latvia in 1944 during World War II, eventually arriving in the United States in 1950.

Career
Lynn portrayed "Fräulein Helga", Colonel Klink's original secretary in Hogan's Heroes during the first season (1965–1966). The role was played by Sigrid Valdis as "Hilda" in the next five seasons. Lynn returned to the series in the 1968 and 1971 episodes "Will the Blue Baron Strike Again" and "Easy Come, Easy Go", respectively. Her last acting role was in 1975 in an episode of Harry O. She also appeared in such television series as Gidget Grows Up, Mission: Impossible, The Odd Couple, Love American Style, and The Six Million Dollar Man.

Lynn wrote an autobiography, Escape to Freedom, in 2000, with the assistance of Edward Ansara.

Personal life
Lynn was romantically involved with actor Marlon Brando. After Brando's death in 2004, Lynn's daughter, Lisa, claimed that her mother and Brando's short-lived affair resulted in her birth in 1964. Lynn had also been in a romantic relationship with Hogan's Heroes costar Bob Crane.

Death
Lynn died on March 10, 2014, at age 76, from multiple organ failure after being stricken with hepatitis. She is survived by her daughter, Lisa, and son, Tony.

Filmography

References

External links

  
 AllMovie.com profile; accessed April 16, 2014

1937 births
2014 deaths
American memoirists
American television actresses
Latvian emigrants to the United States
Latvian World War II refugees
Deaths from hepatitis
Infectious disease deaths in California
American women memoirists
Deaths from multiple organ failure
21st-century American women